A Harlot's Progress is a 2006 British television film directed by Justin Hardy and starring Zoe Tapper, Toby Jones, Sophie Thompson and Richard Wilson. The story is based on the series of paintings entitled A Harlot's Progress by William Hogarth. Hogarth's work is inspired by his interactions with an eighteenth-century prostitute Mary Collins. It originally aired on Channel 4 on 2 November 2006.

Main cast
 Zoe Tapper - Mary Collins
 Toby Jones - William Hogarth
 Sophie Thompson - Jane Hogarth
 Richard Wilson - Sir James Thornhill
 Geraldine James - Madame Needham

References

External links

2006 television films
2006 films
British television films
Films set in the 1730s
Films set in the 18th century
Biographical films about painters
Channel 4 television films
Films directed by Justin Hardy
Cultural depictions of William Hogarth
2000s English-language films